Josh Earl (born 26 June 1981) is an Australian stand-up comedian, television and radio presenter, musician and formerly worked in a school library. He was the presenter of the comeback version of the ABC's musical quiz show Spicks and Specks that ran from 5 February to 19 December 2014.

Career
Among Earl's many comedy performances have been Josh Earl is a Librarian which has been performed in Adelaide and Melbourne, and Josh Earl vs. The Australian Women's Weekly Children's Birthday Cake Book, which toured Victoria and interstate venues.

Earl's radio appearances include the Lime Champions sketch show on Melbourne FM radio 3RRR and appearances on Triple J and radio 774 ABC Melbourne.

His television performances include the original Spicks and Specks show, Talkin' 'Bout Your Generation and Adam Hills Tonight.

Earl has also appeared over nine times at the Melbourne International Comedy Festival.

Awards
 Perth Fringe Festival 2012 – Best Comedy

Personal life
Earl is married and has two children.

References

External links
Josh Earl website
Josh Earl facebook page
Josh Earl Twitter account
Spicks and Specks website

Living people
People from Burnie, Tasmania

1981 births
Australian male comedians
Australian game show hosts